Frances Talbot may refer to:

Frances Talbot, Countess of Tyrconnell  (c. 1649–1731), a maid of honour to the Duchess of York 
Frances Talbot, Countess of Morley (1782–1857), English author and artist

See also
Francis Talbot (disambiguation)